Ulick MacRichard Burke, 1st Marquess of Clanricarde, 5th Earl of Clanricarde, 2nd Earl of St Albans (1604, in London – July 1657, in Kent), was an Anglo-Irish nobleman who was involved in the Wars of the Three Kingdoms. A Catholic Royalist who had overall command of the Irish forces during the later stages of the Cromwellian conquest of Ireland, he was created Marquess of Clanricarde (1646).

Birth and origins 

Ulick was the son of Richard Burke, 4th Earl of Clanricarde by his wife Frances Walsingham. Ulick's father was from an Anglo-Norman family who had been long settled in the west of Ireland. Although during the early sixteenth century the family had rebelled against the Crown on several occasions, Ulick's father had been a strong supporter of Queen Elizabeth. He fought on the Queen's side during Tyrone's Rebellion, notably at the victorious Battle of Kinsale, where he was wounded. After the war, he married the widow of Robert Devereux, 2nd Earl of Essex, a recent commander in Ireland, who was the daughter of the English Secretary of State and spymaster Sir Francis Walsingham.

Marriage 
In 1622, Ulick married Anne Compton, daughter of William Compton, 1st Earl of Northampton, and his wife, Elizabeth Spencer.

Ulick and Anne had an only child, Margaret (died  1698), who married:
 1st Charles MacCarty, Viscount Muskerry, and had a son Charles, 3rd Earl of Clancarty who died young  
 2ndly Robert Villiers, son of Robert Danvers or Villiers, who was himself the suppositious son of John Villiers, 1st Viscount Purbeck
 3rdly the notorious rake and soldier of fortune Robert Fielding

Early career 
Ulick was summoned to the House of Lords as Lord Burgh in 1628, and succeeded his father as 5th Earl of Clanricarde in 1635. In 1636, he inherited Somerhill House on the death of his father. He was a staunch opponent of the policies of the Lord Deputy of Ireland, Thomas Wentworth, 1st Earl of Strafford, who had attempted to seize much of the great Burke inheritance in Connacht for the Crown; there was also personal ill-feeling between the two men since the dispute was thought by many to have hastened the death of Ulick's elderly father. He sat in the Short Parliament of 1640 and attended King Charles I on the Scottish expedition. Charles, unlike Strafford, liked and trusted Lord Clanricarde.

Wars of the Three Kingdoms 
Somerhill was sequestered by Parliament in 1645, following the Battle of Naseby. During the Irish Confederate Wars, Lord Clanricarde supported the Royalist leader  Ormonde in defending Ireland for Charles I against the Parliamentarians by uniting Catholic and Protestant nobles (he being Catholic). He did not join the Catholic Confederate Ireland, but instead helped to broker a military alliance between the Confederates and English Royalists. He commanded the forces of this alliance during the Cromwellian conquest of Ireland, after Lord Ormonde fled the country, and soldiers of his Connaught army helped to win a minor victory at the Battle of Tecroghan. Only a few months later, however, his army was wiped out during the Battle of Meelick Island. Clanricarde was a skilful diplomat but not a great soldier. Like Ormonde, Clanricarde was distrusted by most Catholics in Ireland (he was widely considered to be a friend of the notorious Charles Coote) and thus was thus not capable of halting the Parliamentarian conquest of the country. He was also widely regarded as a man whose actions were governed almost entirely by self-interest.

Later life 
In 1652, Lord Clanricarde made peace with the victorious Oliver Cromwell. He lost his lands in the Act of Settlement 1652 but his heirs regained them after the Restoration of Charles II in the Act of Settlement 1662. On his death, the marquessate became extinct; the earldom passed to his cousin Richard.

Arms

Notes and references

Notes

Citations

Sources

Further reading 
 
 

 
 

1604 births
1657 deaths
Irish soldiers
17th-century Irish people
Burke
Burke, 1st Marquess of Clanricarde, Ulick
Ulick
Members of the Irish House of Lords
Marquesses of Clanricarde
Earls of St Albans